Leptodactylodon erythrogaster is a species of frog in the family Arthroleptidae.
It is endemic to Cameroon.
Its natural habitats are subtropical or tropical moist montane forests, rivers, and freshwater springs.
It is threatened by habitat loss.

References

Leptodactylodon
Endemic fauna of Cameroon
Taxonomy articles created by Polbot
Amphibians described in 1971
Fauna of the Cameroonian Highlands forests